Albert Steffen (10 December 1884, Wynau, Switzerland – 13 July 1963, Dornach, Switzerland) was a poet, painter, dramatist, essayist, and novelist. He joined the Theosophical Society in Germany in 1910, and the Anthroposophical Society in 1912 and became its president after the death of its founder, Rudolf Steiner, in 1925. Steffen was chief editor of the society's journal, Das Goetheanum, from 1921–1963.

Steffen wrote many plays (Hiram and Solomon, Manes' Experience of Death), novels (Oasis of Humanity, The Renewal of the Association), and essays (The Artist Between West and East). Other than a volume of poetry published with the American poet Percy MacKaye, containing both of their poetry translated by each other, few of his works have appeared in English.

His earliest works, predating his encounter with anthroposophy, already manifest a spiritual awareness. His later works, which reflect a vision of the world permeated by metaphysical powers of good and evil, draw on a wide range of esoteric European and Asian traditions.

References

External links
 Adonis Press
 Albert Steffen Foundation (in German)

1884 births
1963 deaths
People from Oberaargau District
Anthroposophists
Swiss poets in German